Oswego High School may refer to one of several high schools in the United States:

Oswego High School (New York)
Oswego Junior Senior High School (Kansas)
Oswego East High School, Oswego, Illinois
Oswego High School (Illinois)
Lake Oswego High School, Oregon